Juan José Jiménez Collar (born 29 July 1957), known as Juan José, is a Spanish retired footballer who played as a right-back.

Nicknamed Sandokan due to striking similarities with the fictional character, he was mainly associated with Cádiz, but also spent three years with Real Madrid, appearing in 231 La Liga games in exactly ten seasons.

Club career
Born in Cádiz, Andalusia, Juan José started his professional career with hometown club Cádiz CF, in the second division. In 1982 he signed with La Liga giants Real Madrid, being relatively used over three seasons; his only piece of silverware arrived in his last, but he had already lost his starting job to youngster Chendo.

Juan José closed out his career with his first team, helping the Andalusians to six consecutive top-flight campaigns, with the player averaging 25 games per year. He retired at the age of 34.

International career
Juan José played four times for Spain, all coming in matches for the UEFA Euro 1984 qualifiers where the side eventually finished runners-up, although he did not make the final cut. He was the first Cádiz player to ever be called by the national team.

Post-retirement
After retiring, Juan José was forced to return to active due to economic problems, working for several years in a shipyard amongst other jobs. In June 1993, he was arrested for his alleged participation in a cocaine distribution network.

Honours
Real Madrid
Copa de la Liga: 1985
UEFA Cup Winners' Cup runner-up: 1982–83

References

External links

Stats and bio at Cadistas1910 

1957 births
Living people
Spanish footballers
Footballers from Cádiz
Association football defenders
La Liga players
Segunda División players
Tercera División players
Cádiz CF B players
Cádiz CF players
Jerez Industrial CF players
Real Madrid CF players
Spain under-23 international footballers
Spain amateur international footballers
Spain B international footballers
Spain international footballers